The S4W reactor is a naval reactor plant used by the United States Navy to provide electricity generation and propulsion on warships.  The S4W designation stands for:

 S = Submarine platform
 4 = Fourth generation core designed by the contractor
 W = Westinghouse was the contracted designer

This nuclear reactor plant utilized an S3W reactor in an alternate equipment arrangement.

References 

 

United States naval reactors